Geheimakte W.B.1 is a 1942 German drama film directed by Herbert Selpin and starring Alexander Golling, Eva Immermann and Richard Häussler. The film portrays Wilhelm Bauer and his work on developing the submarine. It was based on the novel Der Eiserne Seehund by Hans Arthur Thies.

Cast
 Alexander Golling - Wilhelm Bauer
 Eva Immermann - Sophie Hösly
 Richard Häussler - Großfürst Konstantin
 Herbert Hübner - Admiral Brommy
 Wilhelm P. Krüger - Vater Hösly
 Günther Lüders - Schiffsbauer Karl Hösly
 Willi Rose - Werftmeister Schultze
 Gustav Waldau - König Maximilian
 Justus Paris - Vorsitzender des Gerichts
 Theo Shall - Mr. Wood
 Walter Holten - General
 Andrews Engelmann - Russischer Intrigant Trotzky
 Karl Meixner - Senator
 Viktor Afritsch - von Klamm
 Albert Arid - Offizier der russischen Hafenwache
 Karl Hanft - Tony
 Michl Lang - Oberhofen
 Richard Ludwig - Major der russischen Wache
 Philipp Manning - Holm
 Friedrich Ulmer - Dr. Hoffmann
 Paul Wagner - Begleiter des König Maximilian
 Aruth Wartan - Kenwolsky
 Dolf Zenzen - Begleiter Trotzkys am bayerischen Hof

References

Bibliography
 Bergfelder, Tim & Bock, Hans-Michael. The Concise Cinegraph: Encyclopedia of German. Berghahn Books, 2009.
 Hadley, Michael L. Count Not the Dead: The Popular Image of the German Submarine''. McGill-Queen's University Press, 1995.

External links

1942 films
1940s biographical drama films
German biographical drama films
Films of Nazi Germany
1940s German-language films
Films directed by Herbert Selpin
Films based on German novels
Submarine films
Films set in the 19th century
German black-and-white films
1942 drama films
1940s German films